The Trzebnickie Hills (also Kocie Góry from , "Cat Mountains") is a mountain range in southwestern Poland. It is named after the town of Trzebnica on the northern slope.

The range is located in the Lower Silesian Voivodeship. It lies north of the regional capital Wrocław, between the Oder and Widawa Rivers to the southwest and the Barycz River to the north. The terminal moraine was formed during the Wolstonian Stage of the Pleistocene (300,000 - 130,000 years BC), consisting of boulder, gravel and clay with loess sediments on the surface. The landscape is made up of fields, woods and orchards; in the Middle Ages it was also the site of several vineyards.

Towns located near the hills include:
 Oborniki Śląskie
 Oleśnica
 Prusice
 Syców
 Trzebnica
 Twardogóra
 Wołów
 Wrocław

Mountain ranges of Poland
Landforms of Lower Silesian Voivodeship